Huacho is a 2009 Chilean art film directed by Alejandro Fernández Almendras in his debut feature. The film has its world premiere in Competition as part of Critics' Week at the 2009 Cannes Film Festival. Subsequently, it won Best Film at the Viña del Mar International Film Festival, and the First Coral Prize for Best Opera Prima at the Havana Film Festival.

Plot
One day in the life of a typical rural family from central Chile. The grandmother sells cheeses on the roadside, the grandfather works in the fields, the daughter is a cook at an inn, and the grandson goes to school. In four distinct sections, we observe their small joys and struggles throughout a day that unabashedly showcases a transforming Chile that few are familiar with.

Cast
 Manuel Hernández
 Alejandra Yañez 
 Clemira Aguayo 
 Cornelio Villagrán

References

External links

2009 films
Chilean drama films
Films shot in Chile
Films set in Chile